Ryan Michael Dzingel (born March 9, 1992) is an American professional ice hockey forward with the Chicago Wolves in the American Hockey League (AHL) while under contract to the Carolina Hurricanes of the National Hockey League (NHL). He has previously played for the Ottawa Senators, Columbus Blue Jackets, Arizona Coyotes and San Jose Sharks. He was drafted by the Senators in the seventh round (204th overall) of the 2011 NHL Entry Draft. Prior to becoming professional, Dzingel played three seasons with the Ohio State Buckeyes where he was named to the 2013–14 All-Big Ten First Team and West First-Team All-American.

Playing career

Amateur
As a youth, Dzingel played in the 2005 Quebec International Pee-Wee Hockey Tournament with the Chicago Mission minor ice hockey team.

While playing with the Lincoln Stars in the United States Hockey League, Dzingel was drafted 204th overall by the Ottawa Senators and committed to play for the Ohio State University.

On January 10, 2014, Dzingel recorded the first hat trick in Big Ten history to help lead the Ohio State Buckeyes to a 5–3 win over Michigan State. Following an outstanding junior year with the Buckeyes, Dzingel was named to the 2013–14 All-Big Ten First Team.  Prior to his senior year, Dzingel signed an entry level contract with the Senators on April 2, 2014 and reported to their American Hockey League affiliate, the Binghamton Senators, ending his collegiate career.

Professional

Ottawa Senators
On December 22, 2015, Dzingel made his NHL debut with Ottawa versus the Florida Panthers as a replacement for injured Bobby Ryan. He scored his first career NHL goal on February 16, 2016, in a 2–1 shootout win over the Buffalo Sabres.

During the 2016–17 season, his first full year with the Senators, Dzingel recorded 14 goals and 32 points in 81 games. On July 21, 2017, the Senators re-signed Dzingel to a two-year, $3.6 million contract worth $1.8 million annually, avoiding arbitration.

Columbus Blue Jackets
On February 24, 2019, Dzingel, along with a 2019 seventh-round pick, was traded to the Columbus Blue Jackets in exchange for Anthony Duclair and second-round picks in 2020 and 2021.

Carolina Hurricanes
On July 12, 2019, Dzingel signed as a free agent to a two-year, $6.75 million contract with the Carolina Hurricanes.

Return to Ottawa
In his final year under contract with the Hurricanes in the pandemic delayed 2020–21 season, Dzingel was unable to have the desired impact producing just 2 goals and 4 points in 11 games before he was traded back to the Senators in exchange for Alex Galchenyuk and Cédric Paquette on February 13, 2021. Dzingel played out the remainder of his contract with the Senators, posting 6 goals and 9 points in 29 games.

Arizona Coyotes
On July 28, 2021, as a free agent from the Senators, Dzingel was signed to a one-year, $1.1 million contract with his fourth NHL club, the Arizona Coyotes.

San Jose Sharks
On February 19, 2022, Dzingel was traded along with Ilya Lyubushkin to the Toronto Maple Leafs in exchange for Nick Ritchie and either a third-round pick in 2023 or a second-round pick in 2025. On the next day, Toronto placed him on waivers. Dzingel was subsequently claimed off waivers from Toronto by the San Jose Sharks.

Return to Carolina 
On July 25, 2022, Dzingel returned as a free agent to the Carolina Hurricanes and was signed to a one-year, two-way $750,000 contract.

Personal life
Dzingel was born and raised in Chicago to parents Rick and Linda, along with two siblings. His father Rick played baseball growing up, including within the St. Louis Cardinals organization.

Career statistics

Awards and honors

References

External links
 

1992 births
Living people
AHCA Division I men's ice hockey All-Americans
American men's ice hockey left wingers
Arizona Coyotes players
Binghamton Senators players
Carolina Hurricanes players
Chicago Wolves players
Columbus Blue Jackets players
Ice hockey players from Illinois
Lincoln Stars players
Ohio State Buckeyes men's ice hockey players
Ottawa Senators draft picks
Ottawa Senators players
San Jose Sharks players
Sportspeople from Wheaton, Illinois